In molecular biology, JPX transcript, XIST activator (non-protein coding), also known as Jpx, is a long non-coding RNA.  In humans, it is located on the X chromosome. It was identified during sequence analysis of the X inactivation centre, surrounding the Xist gene. Jpx upregulates expression of Xist.

See also
 Long noncoding RNA

References

Further reading

Non-coding RNA